Demar Dotson (born October 11, 1985) is a former American football offensive tackle. He was signed by the Tampa Bay Buccaneers as an undrafted free agent in 2009. He played college football at Southern Mississippi.

Professional career

Tampa Bay Buccaneers
Dotson signed with the Tampa Bay Buccaneers after going undrafted in the 2009 NFL Draft.

In 2012, Dotson re-signed with the Buccaneers on a two-year deal. On September 18, Dotson won the starting right tackle job, beating Jeremy Trueblood. On March 28, 2013, Dotson signed a new four-year contract extension.

In 2013, he was expected to compete with Gabe Carimi, whom the Bucs traded for in June 2013, for the starting position at right tackle. In 2014, after starting 14 games as starting right tackle, Dotson moved to left tackle after poor performances from Anthony Collins.

In 2017, Dotson started 12 games at right tackle before being placed on injured reserve on November 29, 2017.

Denver Broncos
On August 11, 2020, Dotson signed with the Denver Broncos. He started eight games at right tackle in 2020.

References

External links
Tampa Bay Buccaneers bio
Southern Miss Golden Eagles bio

1985 births
Living people
American football offensive guards
American football offensive tackles
American men's basketball players
Denver Broncos players
Players of American football from Louisiana
Southern Miss Golden Eagles basketball players
Southern Miss Golden Eagles football players
Sportspeople from Alexandria, Louisiana
Tampa Bay Buccaneers players
Ed Block Courage Award recipients